Kingswood is a constituency represented in the House of Commons of the UK Parliament since 2010 by Chris Skidmore, a Conservative.

History 
The constituency has existed since the February 1974 general election. This marginal constituency has been held by the Conservative and Labour parties to date. Before the 2010 election, when the seat was held by Labour, it was 135th on the Conservative Party target seats list and in the 2015 election it was 41st on the Labour Party's target seats.

Boundaries 
1974–1983: The Urban Districts of Kingswood and Mangotsfield, and the Rural District of Warmley.

1983–1997: The District of Kingswood wards of Chase, Chiphouse, Downend, Forest, Hanham, Mangotsfield, New Cheltenham, Soundwell, Staple Hill, and Woodstock, and the City of Bristol wards of Frome Vale, Hillfields, St George East, and St George West.

1997–2010: The Borough of Kingswood wards of Badminton, Blackhorse, Bromley Heath, Chase, Chiphouse, Downend, Forest, Hanham, Mangotsfield, New Cheltenham, Oldland Barrs Court, Oldland Cadbury Heath, Oldland Longwell Green, Siston, Soundwell, Springfield, Staple Hill, and Woodstock, and the City of Bristol wards of Frome Vale and Hillfields.

May 2019 to present: The District of South Gloucestershire wards of Bitton and Oldland Common, Hanham, Kingswood, New Cheltenham, Woodstock, Longwell Green, Parkwall & Warmley.

The constituency covers part of the South Gloucestershire unitary authority, consisting of the eastern suburbs of Bristol and commuter villages outside of the city boundary, including the town of Kingswood. It largely corresponds to the former borough of Kingswood.

The Boundary Commission's Fifth Periodic Review of Westminster constituencies prompted the boundary changes with effect from the 2010 general election. In particular, all wards in the constituency are now from the South Gloucestershire authority. Prior to 2010, the Frome Vale and Hillfields wards of the City of Bristol were part of the Kingswood constituency, but have been transferred to Bristol East. Within South Gloucestershire, the Kingswood seat has gained Hanham, Bitton and Oldland Common from the former Wansdyke constituency, but lost Downend and Staple Hill to the new Filton and Bradley Stoke seat.

Members of Parliament

Elections

Elections in the 2010s

Elections in the 2000s

Elections in the 1990s

Elections in the 1980s

Elections in the 1970s

See also 
 List of parliamentary constituencies in Avon

Notes

References

Kingswood, South Gloucestershire
Parliamentary constituencies in South West England
Politics of South Gloucestershire District
South Gloucestershire District
Constituencies of the Parliament of the United Kingdom established in 1974